

Events

Pre-1600
61 BC – Pompey the Great celebrates his third triumph for victories over the pirates and the end of the Mithridatic Wars on his 45th birthday.
1011 – Danes capture Canterbury after a siege, taking Ælfheah, archbishop of Canterbury, as a prisoner.
1227 – Frederick II, Holy Roman Emperor, is excommunicated by Pope Gregory IX for his failure to participate in the Crusades during the Investiture Controversy.
1267 – The Treaty of Montgomery recognises Llywelyn ap Gruffudd as Prince of Wales, but only as a vassal of King Henry III.
1364 – During the Hundred Years' War, Anglo-Breton forces defeat the Franco-Breton army in Brittany, ending the War of the Breton Succession.
1567 – During the French War of Religion, Protestant coup officials in Nîmes massacre Catholic priests in an event now known as the Michelade.
1578 – Tegucigalpa, capital city of Honduras, is claimed by the Spaniards.

1601–1900
1714 – The Cossacks of the Russian Empire kill about 800 people overnight in Hailuoto during the Great Hatred.
1717 – An earthquake strikes Antigua Guatemala, destroying much of the city's architecture.
1789 – The United States Department of War first establishes a regular army with a strength of several hundred men.
1829 – The Metropolitan Police of London, later also known as the Met, is founded.
1848 – The Battle of Pákozd is a stalemate between Hungarian and Croatian forces and is the first battle of the Hungarian Revolution.
1850 – The papal bull Universalis Ecclesiae restores the Roman Catholic hierarchy in England and Wales.
1855 – The Philippine port of Iloilo is opened to world trade by the Spanish administration.
1864 – The Battle of Chaffin's Farm is fought in the American Civil War.
  1864   – The Treaty of Lisbon defines the boundaries between Spain and Portugal and abolishes the Couto Misto microstate.
1885 – The first practical public electric tramway in the world is opened in Blackpool, England.

1901–present
1907 – The cornerstone is laid at the Cathedral Church of Saint Peter and Saint Paul (better known as Washington National Cathedral) in Washington, D.C.
1911 – Italy declares war on the Ottoman Empire.
1918 – Bulgaria signs the Armistice of Salonica ending its participation in World War I.
  1918   – The Hindenburg Line is broken by an Allied attack in World War I.
  1918   – Germany's Supreme Army Command tells Kaiser Wilhelm II and Imperial Chancellor Georg Michaelis to open negotiations for an armistice to end World War I.
1920 – Ukrainian War of Independence: The Ukrainian Soviet Socialist Republic agree to a truce with the Makhnovshchina.
1923 – The Mandate for Palestine takes effect, creating Mandatory Palestine.
  1923   – The Mandate for Syria and Lebanon takes effect.
  1923   – The First American Track and Field championships for women are held.
1932 – Last day of the Battle of Boquerón between Paraguay and Bolivia during the Chaco War.
1940 – Two Avro Ansons collide in mid-air over New South Wales, Australia, remain locked together, then land safely.
1941 – During World War II, German forces, with the aid of local Ukrainian collaborators, begin the two-day Babi Yar massacre.
1954 – The convention establishing CERN (the European Organization for Nuclear Research) is signed.
1957 – The Kyshtym disaster is the third-worst nuclear accident ever recorded.
1959 – A Lockheed L-188 Electra crashes in Buffalo, Texas, killing 34 people.
1971 – Oman joins the Arab League.
1972 – Japan establishes diplomatic relations with the People's Republic of China after breaking official ties with the Republic of China.
1975 – WGPR becomes the first black-owned-and-operated television station in the US.
1979 – The dictator Francisco Macias of Equatorial Guinea is executed by soldiers from Western Sahara.
1981 – An Iranian Air Force Lockheed C-130 Hercules military transport aircraft crashes into a firing range near Kahrizak, Iran, killing 80 people.
1988 – NASA launches STS-26, the first Space Shuttle mission since the Challenger disaster.
1990 – Construction of the Cathedral Church of Saint Peter and Saint Paul (better known as Washington National Cathedral) is completed in Washington, D.C.
  1990   – The YF-22, which would later become the F-22 Raptor, flies for the first time.
  1990   – The Tampere Hall, the largest concert and congress center in the Nordic countries, is inaugurated in Tampere, Finland.
1991 – A Haitian coup d'état occurs.
1992 – Brazilian President Fernando Collor de Mello is impeached.
2004 – The asteroid 4179 Toutatis passes within four lunar distances of Earth.
  2004   – Burt Rutan's Ansari SpaceShipOne performs a successful spaceflight, the first of two required to win the Ansari X Prize.
2005 – John Roberts is confirmed as Chief Justice of the United States.
2006 – A Boeing 737 and an Embraer 600 collide in mid-air, killing 154 people and triggering a Brazilian aviation crisis.
2007 – Calder Hall, the world's first commercial nuclear power station, is demolished in a controlled explosion.
2008 – The stock market crashes after the first United States House of Representatives vote on the Emergency Economic Stabilization Act fails, leading to the Great Recession.
2009 – The 8.1  Samoa earthquake results in a tsunami that kills over 189 and injures hundreds.
2011 – The special court in India convicted all 269 accused officials for atrocity on Dalits and 17 for rape in the Vachathi case.
2013 – Over 42 people are killed by members of Boko Haram at the College of Agriculture in Nigeria.
2016 – Eleven days after the Uri attack, the Indian Army conducts "surgical strikes" against suspected militants in Pakistani-administered Kashmir.
2019 – Violence and low turnout mar the 2019 Afghan presidential election.

Births

Pre-1600
106 BC – Pompey, Roman general and politician (d. 48 BC)
1240 – Margaret of England, Queen consort of Scots (d. 1275)
1402 – Ferdinand the Holy Prince of Portugal (d. 1443)
1511 – Michael Servetus, Spanish physician, cartographer, and theologian (d. 1553)
1527 – John Lesley, Scottish bishop (d. 1596)
1547 – Miguel de Cervantes, Spanish novelist, poet, and playwright (d. 1616)
1548 – William V, Duke of Bavaria (d. 1626)
1561 – Adriaan van Roomen, Flemish priest and mathematician (d. 1615)
1574 – Ludovic Stewart, 2nd Duke of Lennox, Scottish nobleman and politician (d. 1624)

1601–1900
1602 – Algernon Percy, 10th Earl of Northumberland, English military leader (d. 1668)
1636 – Thomas Tenison, English archbishop (d. 1715)
1639 – William Russell, Lord Russell, English politician (d. 1683)
1640 – Antoine Coysevox, French sculptor and educator (d. 1720)
1673 – Jacques-Martin Hotteterre, French flute player and composer (d. 1763)
1691 – Richard Challoner, English bishop (d. 1781)
1703 – François Boucher, French painter and set designer (d. 1770)
1725 – Robert Clive, English general and politician, Lord Lieutenant of Montgomeryshire (d. 1774)
1758 – Horatio Nelson, 1st Viscount Nelson, English admiral (d. 1805)
1766 – Charlotte, Princess Royal of England (d. 1828)
1803 – Jacques Charles François Sturm, French mathematician and theorist (d. 1850)
1808 – Henry Bennett, American lawyer and politician (d. 1868)
1810 – Elizabeth Gaskell, English author (d. 1865)
1812 – Adolph Göpel, German mathematician (d. 1847)
1832 – Joachim Oppenheim, Czech rabbi and author (d. 1891)
  1832   – Miguel Miramón, Unconstitutional president of Mexico (d. 1867)
1843 – Mikhail Skobelev, Russian general (d. 1882)
1844 – Miguel Ángel Juárez Celman, Argentinian lawyer and politician, 10th President of Argentina (d. 1909)
  1844   – Edward Pulsford, English-Australian politician and free-trade campaigner (d. 1919)
1853 – Luther D. Bradley, American cartoonist (d. 1917)
1863 – Ludwig Holborn, German physicist (d. 1926)
1863 – Hugo Haase, German lawyer, jurist, and politician (d. 1919)
1864 – Miguel de Unamuno, Spanish philosopher and author (d. 1936)
1866 – Mykhailo Hrushevskyi, Ukrainian historian, academic, and politician (d. 1934)
1881 – Ludwig von Mises, Austrian-American economist, sociologist, and philosopher (d. 1973)
1882 – Lilias Armstrong, English phonetician (d. 1937)
1891 – Ian Fairweather, Scottish-Australian painter (d. 1974)
1895 – Clarence Ashley, American singer, guitarist, and banjo player (d. 1967)
  1895   – Joseph Banks Rhine, American botanist and parapsychologist (d. 1980)
  1895   – Roscoe Turner, American pilot (d. 1970)
1897 – Herbert Agar, American journalist and historian (d. 1980)
1898 – Trofim Lysenko, Ukrainian-Russian biologist and agronomist (d. 1976)
1899 – László Bíró, Hungarian-Argentinian journalist and inventor, invented the ballpoint pen (d. 1985)
  1899   – Billy Butlin, South African-English businessman, founded Butlins (d. 1980)

1901–present
1901 – Lanza del Vasto, Italian poet, philosopher, and activist (d. 1981)
  1901   – Enrico Fermi, Italian-American physicist and academic, Nobel Prize laureate (d. 1954)
1903 – Miguel Alemán Valdés, Mexican lawyer and civilian politician, 46th President of Mexico (d. 1983)
  1903   – Diana Vreeland, American journalist (d. 1989)
1904 – Greer Garson, English-American actress (d. 1996)
  1904   – Michał Waszyński, Polish film director and producer (d. 1965)
1905 – Fidel LaBarba, American boxer and sportswriter (d. 1981)
1906 – Henry Nash Smith, American academic (d. 1986)
1907 – Gene Autry, American singer, actor, and businessman (d. 1998)
  1907   – George W. Jenkins, American businessman, founded Publix (d. 1996)
1908 – Eddie Tolan, American sprinter and educator (d. 1967)
1909 – Virginia Bruce, American actress (d. 1982)
1910 – Bill Boyd, American singer and guitarist (d. 1977)
  1910   – Diosdado Macapagal, Philippine politician, 9th President of the Philippines (d. 1997) 
1911 – Charles Court, English-Australian politician, 21st Premier of Western Australia (d. 2007)
  1911   – Reginald Victor Jones, British physicist and scientific military intelligence expert (d. 1997)
1912 – Michelangelo Antonioni, Italian director and screenwriter (d. 2007)
1913 – Trevor Howard, English actor (d. 1988)
  1913   – Stanley Kramer, American director and producer (d. 2001)
  1913   – Rutherford Ness Robertson, Australian botanist and biologist (d. 2001)
1914 – Olive Dehn, English author and poet (d. 2007)
1915 – Vincent DeDomenico, American businessman, founded the Napa Valley Wine Train (d. 2007) 
  1915   – Oscar Handlin, American historian and academic (d. 2011)
  1915   – Brenda Marshall, American actress (d. 1992)
1916 – Carl Giles, English cartoonist (d. 1995)
  1916   – Josef Traxel, German operatic tenor (d. 1975)
1918 – Billy Bevis, English footballer (d. 1994)
1919 – Bill Proud, English cricketer (d. 1961)
1920 – Peter D. Mitchell, English biochemist and academic, Nobel Prize laureate (d. 1992)
1921 – James Cross, Irish-British diplomat (d. 2021)
  1921   – John Ritchie, New Zealand composer and educator (d. 2014)
1922 – Reed Irvine, American economist and activist (d. 2004)
  1922   – Lizabeth Scott, American actress (d. 2015)
1923 – Stan Berenstain, American author and illustrator (d. 2005)
  1923   – Bum Phillips, American football player and coach (d. 2013)
1925 – Steve Forrest, American actor (d. 2013)
  1925   – Paul MacCready, American engineer, founded AeroVironment (d. 2007)
1926 – Chuck Cooper, American basketball player (d. 1984)
  1926   – Pete Elliott, American football player and coach (d. 2013)
1927 – Pete McCloskey, American politician
  1927   – Barbara Mertz, American historian and author (d. 2013)
1928 – Eric Lubbock, 4th Baron Avebury, English lieutenant, engineer, and politician (d. 2016)
  1928   – Brajesh Mishra, Indian politician and diplomat, 1st Indian National Security Advisor (d. 2012)
  1928   – Jeffrey O'Connell, American legal expert, professor, and attorney (d. 2013)
1930 – Richard Bonynge, Australian pianist and conductor
  1930   – Colin Dexter, English author and educator (d. 2017)
1931 – James Cronin, American physicist and academic, Nobel Prize laureate (d. 2016)
  1931   – Anita Ekberg, Swedish-Italian model and actress (d. 2015)
  1931   – Joseph M. McDade, American politician (d. 2017)
1932 – Robert Benton, American director, producer, and screenwriter
  1932   – Mehmood, Indian actor, singer, director and producer
1933 – Samora Machel, Mozambican commander and politician, 1st President of Mozambique (d. 1986)
  1933   – Mars Rafikov, Soviet pilot and cosmonaut (d. 2000)
1934 – Mihaly Csikszentmihalyi, Hungarian-American psychologist and academic (d. 2021)
  1934   – Stuart M. Kaminsky, American author and screenwriter (d. 2009)
1935 – Jerry Lee Lewis, American singer-songwriter and pianist (d. 2022)
  1935   – Carmen Delgado Votaw, Puerto Rican civil rights pioneer (d. 2017)
1936 – Silvio Berlusconi, Italian businessman and politician, 50th Prime Minister of Italy
  1936   – James Fogle, American author (d. 2012)
  1936   – Hal Trosky, Jr., American baseball player (d. 2012)
1937 – Kōichirō Matsuura, Japanese diplomat
  1937   – Tom McKeown, American poet and educator
1938 – Wim Kok, Dutch union leader and politician, Prime Minister of the Netherlands (d. 2018)
  1938   – Michael Stürmer, German historian
1939 – Jim Baxter, Scottish footballer (d. 2001)
  1939   – Larry Linville, American actor (d. 2000)
  1939   – Rhodri Morgan, Welsh politician, 2nd First Minister of Wales (d. 2017)
1940 – Billy Cobb, English footballer
1941 – Oscar H. Ibarra, Filipino-American theoretical computer scientist
  1941   – Robert Lieber, American writer and academic
1942 – Felice Gimondi, Italian cyclist (d. 2019)
  1942   – Madeline Kahn, American actress and singer (d. 1999)
  1942   – Ian McShane, English actor
  1942   – Bill Nelson, American politician
  1942   – Jean-Luc Ponty, French violinist and composer
  1942   – Janet Powell, Australian educator and politician (d. 2013)
  1942   – Steve Tesich, Serbian-American screenwriter and playwright (d. 1996)
1943 – Juan Flores, American academic and professor (d. 2014)
  1943   – Lech Wałęsa, Polish electrician and politician, 2nd President of Poland, Nobel Prize laureate
1944 – Isla Blair, British actress and singer
  1944   – Mike Post, American composer and producer
1945 – Kyriakos Sfetsas, Greek composer and poet
  1945   – Lella Cuberli, American soprano
1946 – Patricia Hodge, English actress
  1946   – Arturo Lindsay, Panamanian-American artist
1947 – Richard J. Evans, British historian
  1947   – Ülo Kaevats, Estonian philosopher, academic, and politician (d. 2015)
  1947   – S. H. Kapadia, Indian lawyer, judge, and politician, 38th Chief Justice of India (d. 2016)
1948 – Mark Farner, American singer-songwriter and guitarist
  1948   – Bryant Gumbel, American journalist and sportscaster
  1948   – Theo Jörgensmann, German clarinet player and composer
  1948   – John M. McHugh, American politician  
1949 – George Dalaras, Greek singer-songwriter and guitarist
  1949   – Douglas Frantz, American investigative journalist and author
1950 – Merle Collins, Grenadian poet and short story writer
1951 – Michelle Bachelet, Chilean politician, President of Chile
  1951   – Pier Luigi Bersani, Italian educator and politician, 6th President of Emilia-Romagna
  1951   – Roslyn Schwartz, Canadian author
1952 – Roy Campbell, Jr., American trumpet player (d. 2014)
  1952   – Pete Hautman, American author
  1952   – Max Sandlin, American lawyer, judge, and politician
1953 – Mona Baker, Egyptian-British professor
  1953   – Drake Hogestyn, American actor
  1953   – Janis F. Kearney, American author, lecturer and publisher
1954 – Harry E. Johnson, American lawyer and public servant
  1954   – Geoffrey Marcy, American astronomer
1955 – Ann Bancroft, American explorer and author
  1955   – Joe Donnelly, American politician and lawyer
  1955   – Gwen Ifill, American journalist (d. 2016)
1956 – Susanne Antonetta, American poet and author
  1956   – Sebastian Coe, English sprinter and politician
  1956   – Suzzy Roche, American singer-songwriter and actress
1957 – Chris Broad, English cricketer and referee
  1957   – Andrew Dice Clay, American comedian and actor
  1957   – Joel Gallen, American director, producer and screenwriter
  1957   – Mark Nicholas, English cricketer and sportscaster
1958 – Pete Fromm, American author
  1958   – Andy Straka, American author
  1958   – Karen Young, American actress
1959 – Jon Fosse, Norwegian author and dramatist
  1959   – Marissa Moss, American author
1960 – Steve Burke, English footballer
  1960   – Rob Deer, American baseball player
1961 – Mohammed Dahlan, Palestinian politician
  1961   – Julia Gillard, Welsh-Australian lawyer and politician, Prime Minister of Australia
1962 – Roger Bart, American actor
1963 – Les Claypool, American bass player, singer, songwriter, and producer
  1963   – Francis Jue, American actor and singer
1964 – PJ Manney, American writer
1965 – Suzanne Kamata, American author and educator
  1965   – Robert F. Worth, American journalist
1966 – Hersey Hawkins, American basketball player and coach
  1966   – Bujar Nishani, Albanian politician, 7th President of Albania (d. 2022)
  1966   – Jill Whelan, American actress
1967 – Sara Sankey, English badminton player
1968 – Darius de Haas, American stage actor and singer
  1968   – Luke Goss, English actor
  1968   – Adam Segal, American cybersecurity expert
1969 – Erika Eleniak, American model and actress
  1969   – Robert Kurzban, American author and professor
  1969   – Carlos Watson, American entrepreneur, journalist and television host
1970 – Emily Lloyd, English actress
  1970   – Russell Peters, Canadian comedian, actor, and producer
  1970   – Natasha Gregson Wagner, American actress
  1970   – Khushbu Sundar, South Indian actress and producer
1971 – Joanna Brooks, American author and professor
  1971   – Ray Buchanan, American football player
  1971   – Mackenzie Crook, English actor and screenwriter
  1971   – Theodore Shapiro, American composer
1972 – Robert Webb, English comedian, actor and writer
1973 – Alfie Boe, English tenor and actor
1974 – Alexis Cruz, American actor
  1974   – Dedric Ward, American football wide receiver
1975 – Stephanie Klein, American author
1976 – Darren Byfield, English-Jamaican footballer
  1976   – Kelvin Davis, English footballer
1978 – Kurt Nilsen, Norwegian singer-songwriter and guitarist
  1978   – Neville Roach, English footballer
  1978   – Nathan West, actor, musician, and singer
1980 – Dallas Green, Canadian singer-songwriter and guitarist
  1980   – Zachary Levi, American actor and singer
  1980   – Chrissy Metz, American actress
1981 – Matt Piper, English footballer and coach
  1981   – Suzanne Shaw, English actress and singer
1982 – Adrian Moody, English footballer
1983 – Ryan Garry, English footballer and coach
1984 – Per Mertesacker, German footballer
1985 – Calvin Johnson, American football player
  1985   – Michelle Payne, Australian jockey
1986 – Inika McPherson, American track and field athlete
1988 – Samuel Di Carmine, Italian footballer
  1988   – Kevin Durant, American basketball player
1989 – Shyima Hall, Egyptian human rights activist
  1989   – Aaron Martin, English footballer
1990 – Doug Brochu, American voice actor
1991 – Souleymane Doukara, French footballer
  1991   – Nathan Modest, English footballer
1993 – Nathan Buddle, English footballer
1994 – Halsey, American singer
1995 – Sasha Lane, American actress
1998 – Vera Lapko, Belarusian tennis player
1999 – Choi Ye-na, South Korean singer and dancer

Deaths

Pre-1600
 722 – Leudwinus, Frankish archbishop and saint (b. 660)
 855 – Lothair I, Roman emperor (b. 795)
1186 – William of Tyre, Archbishop of Tyre (b. 1130)
1225 – Arnaud Amalric, Papal legate who allegedly promoted mass murder
1298 – Guido I da Montefeltro, Italian military strategist (b. 1223)
1304 – John de Warenne, 6th Earl of Surrey, English general (b. 1231)
1364 – Charles I, Duke of Brittany (b. 1319)
1382 – Izz al-Din ibn Rukn al-Din Mahmud, malik of Sistan
1501 – Andrew Stewart, Scottish bishop (b. 1442)
1560 – Gustav I of Sweden (b. 1496)

1601–1900
1637 – Lorenzo Ruiz, Filipino martyr and saint (b. 1600)
1642 – René Goupil, French missionary and saint (b. 1608)
  1642   – William Stanley, 6th Earl of Derby, English politician, Lord Lieutenant of Cheshire (b. 1561)
1715 – George Haliburton, Scottish bishop (b. 1635)
1800 – Michael Denis, Austrian poet and author (b. 1729)
1804 – Michael Hillegas, American politician, 1st Treasurer of the United States (b. 1728)
1833 – Ferdinand VII of Spain (b. 1784)
1850 – David Keith Ballow, Scottish-Australian doctor (b. 1804)
1861 – Tekla Bądarzewska-Baranowska, Polish composer and pianist (b. 1829 or 1834)
1862 – William "Bull" Nelson, American general (b. 1824)
1867 – Sterling Price, American major general and politician (b. 1809)
1887 – Bernhard von Langenbeck, German surgeon and academic (b. 1810)
1889 – Louis Faidherbe, French general and politician (b. 1818)
1898 – Thomas F. Bayard, American lawyer, politician and diplomat (b. 1828)
1900 – Samuel Fenton Cary, American lawyer and politician (b. 1814)

1901–present
1902 – William McGonagall, Scottish poet and actor (b. 1825)
  1902   – Émile Zola, French journalist, author, and playwright (b. 1840)
1904 – Alfred Nehring, German zoologist and paleontologist (b. 1845)
1905 – Alexander Hay Japp, Scottish author, journalist and publisher (b. 1836)
1908 – Machado de Assis, Brazilian author, poet, and playwright (b. 1839)
1910 – Rebecca Harding Davis, American author and journalist (b. 1831)
  1910   – Winslow Homer, American painter, illustrator, and engraver (b. 1836)
1913 – Rudolf Diesel, German engineer, invented the diesel engine (b. 1858)
  1913   – John F. Lacey, American politician (b. 1841)
1915 – Luther Orlando Emerson, American musician, composer and music publisher (b. 1820)
  1915   – Rudi Stephan, German composer (b. 1887)
1918 – Lawrence Weathers, Australian soldier (b. 1890).
1919 – Edward Pulsford, English-Australian politician and free-trade campaigner (b. 1844)
1923 – Walther Penck, German geologist and geomorphologist (b. 1888)
1925 – Léon Bourgeois, French police officer and politician, 64th Prime Minister of France, Nobel Prize laureate (b. 1851)
  1925   – Runar Schildt, Finnish author (b. 1888)
1927 – Arthur Achleitner, German journalist and author (b. 1858)
  1927   – Willem Einthoven, Indonesian-Dutch physiologist and physician, Nobel Prize laureate (b. 1860)
1928 – John Devoy, Irish-American Fenian rebel leader (b. 1842)
  1928   – Ernst Steinitz, German mathematician (b. 1871)
1930 – Ilya Repin, Ukrainian-Russian painter and illustrator (b. 1844)
1931 – William Orpen, Irish artist (b. 1878)
1933 – Jean-François Delmas, French bass-baritone (b. 1861)
1935 – Winifred Holtby, English novelist and journalist (b. 1898)
1937 – Marie Zdeňka Baborová-Čiháková, Czech botanist and zoologist (b. 1877)
  1937   – Ray Ewry, American triple jumper (b. 1873)
1944 – Douglas Crawford McMurtrie, American typeface designer, graphic designer, historian and author (b. 1888)
1949 – Rosa Olitzka, German-American contralto singer (b. 1873)
1951 – Thomas Cahill, American soccer player and coach (b. 1864)
1952 – John Cobb, English race car driver and pilot (b. 1899)
  1952   – C. H. Douglas, British engineer (b. 1879)
1953 – Ernst Reuter, German politician (b. 1889)
1955 – Louis Leon Thurstone, American psychologist (b. 1887)
  1955   – Hubert Maitland Turnbull, British pathologist (b. 1875)
1956 – Anastasio Somoza García, Nicaraguan politician, 21st President of Nicaragua (b. 1896)
1958 – Aarre Merikanto, Finnish composer (b. 1893)
1959 – Bruce Bairnsfather, British humorist and cartoonist (b. 1887)
1960 – John Baillie, Scottish theologian (b. 1886)
  1960   – John Goodwin, British soldier and medical practitioner, 14th Governor of Queensland (b. 1871)
1966 – Bernard Gimbel, American businessman (b. 1885)
1967 – Carson McCullers, American novelist, playwright, essayist, and poet (b. 1917)
1970 – Edward Everett Horton, American actor (b. 1886)
  1970   – Gilbert Seldes, American writer and cultural critic (b. 1893)
1972 – Kathleen Clarke, Irish politician and activist (b. 1878)
1973 – W. H. Auden, English-American poet, playwright, and critic (b. 1907)
1975 – Gladys Skelton, Australian-British poet, novelist and playwright (b. 1885)
  1975   – Casey Stengel, American baseball player and manager (b. 1890)
1977 – Robert McKimson, American animator and illustrator (b. 1910)
  1977   – Alexander Tcherepnin, Russian-American composer and pianist (b. 1899)
1979 – Francisco Macías Nguema, Equatoguinean politician, 1st President of Equatorial Guinea (b. 1924)
  1979   – Ivan Wyschnegradsky, Russian composer (b. 1893)
1980 – Harold Alexander Abramson, American physician (b. 1889)
1981 – Bill Shankly, Scottish footballer and manager (b. 1913)
  1981   – Frances Yates, English historian (b. 1899)
1982 – A. L. Lloyd, English folk singer (b. 1908)
  1982   – Monty Stratton, American baseball player and coach (b. 1912)
1983 – Alan Moorehead, Australian war correspondent and author (b. 1910)
1984 – Geater Davis, American singer and songwriter (b. 1946)
  1984   – Hal Porter, Australian novelist, playwright and poet (b. 1911)
1987 – Henry Ford II, American businessman (b. 1917)
1988 – Charles Addams, American cartoonist (b. 1912)
1989 – Gussie Busch, American businessman (b. 1899)
  1989   – Georges Ulmer, Danish-French singer-songwriter and actor (b. 1919)
1991 – Grace Zaring Stone, American novelist and short-story writer (b. 1891)
1992 – Jean Aurenche, French screenwriter (b. 1904)
  1992   – William H. Sebrell Jr., American nutritionist, 7th Director of the National Institutes of Health (b. 1901)
  1992   – Don West, American writer, poet, educator, trade union organizer and civil-rights activist (b. 1906)
1993 – Gordon Douglas, American actor, director, and screenwriter (b. 1907)
1996 – Shūsaku Endō, Japanese author (b. 1923)
1997 – Sven-Eric Johanson, Swedish composer and organist (b. 1919)
  1997   – Roy Lichtenstein, American painter and sculptor (b. 1923)
1998 – Tom Bradley, American lieutenant and politician, 38th Mayor of Los Angeles (b. 1917)
  1998   – C. David Marsden, British neurologist (b. 1938)
  1998   – Bruno Munari, Italian artist, designer, and inventor (b. 1907)
1999 – Edward William O'Rourke, American bishop (b. 1917)
2000 – John Grant, English journalist and politician (b. 1932)
2001 – Mabel Fairbanks, American figure skater and coach (b. 1915)
  2001   – Nguyễn Văn Thiệu, South Vietnamese military officer and politician, 2nd President of South Vietnam (b. 1923)
2004 – Richard Sainct, French motorcycle racer (b. 1970)
  2004   – Patrick Wormald, English historian (b. 1947)
2005 – Patrick Caulfield, English painter and academic (b. 1936)
  2005   – Austin Leslie, American chef and author (b. 1934)
2006 – Walter Hadlee, New Zealand cricketer and manager (b. 1915)
  2006   – Michael A. Monsoor, American soldier, Medal of Honor recipient (b. 1981)
  2006   – Louis-Albert Vachon, Canadian cardinal (b. 1912)
2007 – Lois Maxwell, Canadian actress (b. 1927)
  2007   – Katsuko Saruhashi, Japanese geochemist (b. 1920)
2008 – Hayden Carruth, American poet and critic (b. 1921)
2010 – Tony Curtis, American actor (b. 1925)
  2010   – Greg Giraldo, American comedian, actor, and screenwriter (b. 1965)
2011 – Sylvia Robinson, American singer-songwriter and producer (b. 1936)
2012 – Neil Smith, Scottish geographer and academic (b. 1954)
  2012   – Arthur Ochs Sulzberger, American publisher (b. 1926)
  2012   – Malcolm Wicks, English academic and politician (b. 1947)
2013 – Harold Agnew, American physicist and engineer (b. 1921)
  2013   – S. N. Goenka, Indian teacher of Vipassanā meditation (b. 1924)
  2013   – Marcella Hazan, Italian cooking writer (b. 1924)
2014 – Mary Cadogan, English author (b. 1928)
  2014   – John Ritchie, New Zealand composer and educator (b. 1921)
2015 – Nawwaf bin Abdulaziz Al Saud, Saudi Arabian prince (b. 1932)
  2015   – Hellmuth Karasek, Czech-German journalist, author, and critic (b. 1934)
  2015   – Phil Woods, American saxophonist, composer, and bandleader (b. 1931)
2016 – Miriam Defensor Santiago, Filipina politician (b. 1945)
2017 – Tom Alter, Indian actor (b. 1950)
2018 – Otis Rush, American blues guitarist and singer (b. 1934)
2019 – Martin Bernheimer, German-American music critic (b. 1936)
2020 – Sabah Al-Ahmad Al-Jaber Al-Sabah, Kuwaiti Emir (b. 1929)
  2020   – Helen Reddy, Australian-American singer, actress, and activist (b. 1941)
2022 – Kathleen Booth, British computer scientist and mathematician (b. 1922)
  2022   – Akissi Kouamé, Ivorian army officer (b. 1955)

Holidays and observances
 Christian feast day:
 Charles, Duke of Brittany
 Hripsime
 Jean de Montmirail
 Theodota of Philippi
 September 29 (Eastern Orthodox liturgics)
 the Archangels Michael, Gabriel, and Raphael. One of the four quarter days in the Irish calendar. (England and Ireland). Called Michaelmas in some western liturgical traditions.
 Inventors' Day (Argentina)
 Victory of Boquerón Day (Paraguay)
 World Heart Day

References

External links

 
 
 

Days of the year
September